Wolfgang Hohlbein wrote more than 200 books. All his books are written in German; only 11 of his books have been translated into English. This is the list of all books written by Wolfgang Hohlbein.

Youth literature

Stand-alone novels 
 Es begann am frühen Morgen (1985, Schneider)
 Kein Platz mehr im Hundehimmel (1986 (2004), with Heike Hohlbein, Ueberreuter)
 Pizzabande - Band 17: Zucker im Tank oder Die Hehlerbande (1986, Schneider)
 Kunibert, der Drachentöter (2004, with Sylvia Petter, Erlebnis Lesen Verlag)
 Saint Nick - Der Tag, an dem der Weihnachtsmann durchdrehte (1997, Heyne)
 Teufelchen (1997, with Heike Hohlbein, Thienemann)
 Die wilden Schwäne (2014, with Heike Hohlbein, arsEdition)
 Drachenbrüder: Der Schwur des Dschingis Khan (2015, Ueberreuter Verlag)

Book series 
 Barbie
(as 'Angela Bonnella')
 1: Barbie Superstar (1991, Xenos)
 2: Barbie in Afrika (1991, Xenos)
 3: Barbie und das Fitness-Studio (1991, Xenos)

 Die Wolf-Gäng
 1: Das Haus der Geister (July 2007, Egmont Franz Schneider)
 2: Ein finsteres Geheimnis (July 2007, with Dieter Winkler, Egmont Franz Schneider)
 3: Wächter der Wahrheit (January 2008, with Rebecca Hohlbein, Egmont Franz Schneider)
 4: Draci gegen die Schweinebande (September 2008, with Dieter Winkler, Egmont Franz Schneider)
 5: Die Rückkehr der Trolle (October 2008, with Rebecca Hohlbein, Egmont Franz Schneider)

 Drachenthal
(with Heike Hohlbein)
 1: Die Entdeckung (2002, Ueberreuter)
 2: Das Labyrinth (2003, Ueberreuter)
 3: Die Zauberkugel (2003, Ueberreuter)
 4: Das Spiegelkabinett (2004, Ueberreuter)
 5: Die Rückkehr (August 2007, Ueberreuter)

 Gespenst ahoi!
 1: Ein Gespenst an Bord (1987, Schneider)
 2: Die gestohlene Geisterkiste (1988, Schneider)
 3: Das schottische Geisterschloß (1988, Schneider)
 4: Achtung, Kamera ab! (1989, Schneider)
 Sammelband 1-3: Gespenst ahoi! (2002, Schneider)
 Sammelband 1-3: Gespenstergeschichten (1995, Schneider)

 Norg
(with Heike Hohlbein)
 1: Im verbotenen Land (2002, Thienemann)
 2: Im Tal des Ungeheuers (2003, Thienemann)

 Irondead

 Irondead - Der zehnte Kreis (2014, Egmont INK)
 Irondead - Der achte Tag (2015, Egmont INK)

Fantasy

Stand-alone novels 
 Die Bedrohung (1994, with Heike Hohlbein, Ueberreuter)
 Drachenfeuer (1988, with Heike Hohlbein, Ueberreuter)
 Der Drachentöter (1989, as 'Martin Heidner', Loewe)
 Elfentanz (1984, with Heike Hohlbein, Ueberreuter)
 Die Heldenmutter (1985, with Heike Hohlbein, Lübbe)
 Midgard (1987, with Heike Hohlbein, Ueberreuter)
 Das Vermächtnis der Feuervögel (2003, Piper)
 Infinity: Der Turm (March 2011, Piper) Hörbuch 
 Die Schneekönigin (October 2015, arsEdition)
 Der Orkling / der Hammer der Götter (October 2013, Bastei Lübbe)
 Laurin (March 2016, Ueberreuter Verlag)

Book series 
 Das Herz des Waldes
 1: Gwenderon (1987, Goldmann)
 2: Cavin (1987, Goldmann)
 3: Megidda (1987, Goldmann)
 Compilation 1-3: Gwenderon-Cavin-Megidda (1994, Weitbrecht)

 Das Schwarze Auge - Das Jahr des Greifen (with Bernhard Hennen)
 1: Der Sturm (1993, Bastei-Lübbe)
 2: Die Entdeckung (1994, Bastei-Lübbe)
 3: Die Amazone (1994, Bastei-Lübbe)
 Compilation  Das Jahr des Greifen 1-3: Drei Romane in einem Band (1995, Bastei-Lübbe)

 Die Asgard-Saga
 1: Thor (2010, Bastei Lübbe)
 2: Die Tochter der Midgardschlange (2010, Baumhaus Verlag Köln)

 Der Drachenzyklus
 1: Die Töchter des Drachen (1987, Bastei-Lübbe)
 2: Der Thron der Libelle (1991, Bastei-Lübbe)
 Sammelband 1-2: Zwei Romane in einem Band (2003, Bastei-Lübbe)

 Wolfsnebel
 1: Der Rabenritter (1986, Ueberreuter)
 2: Der Schattenmagier (1987, Ueberreuter)

 Die Nacht des Drachen
(as 'Michael Marks')
 1: Das Drachenkind (1986, Franckh Kosmos)
 2: Das Felsenvolk (1987, Franckh Kosmos)
 Compilation 1-2: Zwei Romane in einem Band (1998, Ueberreuter)

 Die Saga von Garth und Torian
Volume 1-3 together with Dieter Winkler, Volume 4-6 together with Frank Rehfeld
 1: Die Stadt der schwarzen Krieger (1985, Goldmann)
 2: Die Tochter des Magiers (1987, Goldmann)
 3: Die Katakomben der letzten Nacht (1987, Goldmann)
 4: Die Straße der Ungeheuer (1988, Goldmann)
 5: Die Arena des Todes (1988, Goldmann)
 6: Der Tempel der verbotenen Träume (1988, Goldmann)
 Compilation 1-3: Die Saga von Garth und Torian I (1995, Blanvalet / Goldmann)
 Compilation 4-6: Die Saga von Garth und Torian II (1996, Blanvalet / Goldmann)

 El Mercenario
(Extension based on the comics of Vicente Segrelles)
 1: Der Söldner (1992, Bastei-Lübbe)
 2: Die Formel des Todes (1992, Bastei-Lübbe)
 3: Die vier Prüfungen (1993, Bastei-Lübbe)
 4: Das Opfer (1995, Bastei-Lübbe)

 Enwor
(together with Dieter Winkler)
 1: Der wandernde Wald (1983) 
 2: Die brennende Stadt/Der Stein der Macht 1 (1983) 
 3: Das tote Land/Der Stein der Macht 2 (1984) 
 4: Der steinerne Wolf/Der Stein der Macht 3 (1984) 
 5: Das schwarze Schiff (1984) 
 6: Die Rückkehr der Götter (1987) 
 7: Das schweigende Netz (1988) 
 8: Der flüsternde Turm (1989) 
 9: Das vergessene Heer (1989) 
 10: Die verbotenen Inseln (1989) 
 11: Das elfte Buch (1999) 

Enwor – Neue Abenteuer:
 1: Das magische Reich (2004) 
 2: Die verschollene Stadt (2004) 
 3: Der flüsternde See (2005) 
 4: Der entfesselte Vulkan (2005) 

Enwor gamebook:
 Das große Enwor Rollenspielbuch: Die Insel der Sternenbestie (1995, Goldmann)

 Märchenmond
(with Heike Hohlbein)
 1: Märchenmond (1982, Ueberreuter)
 2: Märchenmonds Kinder (1990, Ueberreuter)
 3: Märchenmonds Erben (1998, Ueberreuter)
 Compilation 1-2: Zwei Romane in einem Band (1999, Heyne)
 Compilation 1-3: Märchenmond /with CD (July 2002, Ueberreuter)
 Das Märchen von Märchenmond (August 1999, Ueberreuter)
 Die Zauberin von Märchenmond (September 2005, Ueberreuter)
 Silberhorn (2009, Ueberreuter)

Volume I to III have been translated into English:

Magic Moon, Tokyopop, 2006, 
Children of Magic Moon, Tokyopop, 2007, 
Legacy of Magic Moon, Tokyopop, 2008, 

Die Chroniken der Elfen
 1: Elfenblut (2009, Otherworld Verlag)
 2: Elfenzorn (2010, Otherworld Verlag)
 3: Elfentod (2011, Otherworld Verlag)

Fiction

Stand-alone novels 
 Das Avalon-Projekt (2000, Droemer Knaur)
 Das Buch (August 2003, with Heike Hohlbein, Ueberreuter)
 Das Druidentor (1993, Droemer Knaur)
 Der Greif (1989, with Heike Hohlbein, Ueberreuter)
 Der Widersacher (1995, Lübbe,  oder)
 Die Rückkehr der Zauberer (1996, Droemer/Knaur)
 Dreizehn (1995, with Heike Hohlbein, Arena)
 Katzenwinter (1997, with Heike Hohlbein, Ueberreuter)
 Krieg der Engel (1999, with Heike Hohlbein, Ueberreuter)
 Schattenjagd (1996, with Heike Hohlbein, Heyne)
 Spiegelzeit (October 1991, with Heike Hohlbein).Heyne)
 Unterland (1992, with Heike Hohlbein, Ueberreuter)
 WASP (July 2008, Ueberreuter)

Book series 
 Anders
(with Heike Hohlbein)
 1: Die tote Stadt Ueberreuter, July 2004 
 2: Im dunklen Land Ueberreuter, August 2004 
 3: Der Thron von Tiernan Ueberreuter, September 2004 
 4: Der Gott der Elder Ueberreuter, October 2004 

 Der Magier
 1: Der Erbe der Nacht (1989, Heyne)
 2: Das Tor ins Nichts (1989, Heyne)
 3: Der Sand der Zeit (1989, Heyne)

 Genesis
(with Heike Hohlbein)
 1: Eis (August 2006, Ueberreuter)
 2: Stein (September 2006, Ueberreuter)
 3: Diamant (October 2006, Ueberreuter)

Historical fiction

Stand-alone novels 
 Das Paulus-Evangelium (2006, vgs)
 Das Siegel (1987, Ueberreuter)
 Der lange Weg nach Ithaka (1989, unter dem Pseudonym Martin Heidner, Loewe)
 Die Kinder von Troja (1984, Lübbe)
 Hagen von Tronje (January 1986, Heyne)

Book series 
 Das Blut der Templer
 1: Das Blut der Templer (December 2004, vgs)  (based on a TV-movie aired on German channel ProSieben in fall 2004)
 2: Die Nacht des Sterns (September 2005, with Rebecca Hohlbein, vgs)

 Die Himmelsscheibe
 1: Die Tochter der Himmelsscheibe (March 2005, Piper)
 2: Die Kriegerin der Himmelsscheibe (December 2010, Piper)

 Die Chronik der Unsterblichen
 1: Am Abgrund (1999, vgs)
 2: Der Vampyr (2000, vgs)
 3: Der Todesstoß (2001, vgs)
 4: Der Untergang (2002, vgs)
 5: Die Wiederkehr (2003, vgs)
 6: Die Blutgräfin (2004, vgs)
 7: Der Gejagte (2004, vgs)
 8: Die Verfluchten (2005, vgs)
 8,5: Blutkrieg (2007, vgs)
 9: Das Dämonenschiff (2007, vgs)
 10: Göttersterben (2008, vgs)
 11: Glut und Asche (October 2009, Egmont Lyx)
 11,5: Seelenraub (March 2013, Egmont Lyx)
 12: Der schwarze Tod (October 2010, Egmont Lyx)
 13: Der Machdi (October 2011, Egmont Lyx)
 14: Pestmond (14. February 2013, Egmont Lyx)
 15: Nekropole (17. October 2013, Egmont Lyx)

 Die Legende von Camelot
(with Heike Hohlbein)
 1: Gralszauber (2000, Ueberreuter)
 2: Elbenschwert (2001, Ueberreuter)
 3: Runenschild (2002, Ueberreuter)
 Compilation 1-3: Die Legende von Camelot (2005, Ueberreuter)

 Die Nibelungen-Saga
(with Torsten Dewi)
 1: Der Ring der Nibelungen (2004, Heyne, 2004)
 2: Die Rache der Nibelungen (2007, Heyne, 2007)
 3: Das Erbe der Nibelungen (2010, Heyne, 2010)
 Compilation 1-2: Die Nibelungen-Saga (Heyne, 2008)

 Die Templerin
 1: Die Templerin (1999, Heyne)
 2: Der Ring des Sarazenen (2002, Heyne)
 3: Die Rückkehr der Templerin (2004, Heyne)
 4: Das Wasser des Lebens (2008, Heyne, with Rebecca Hohlbein)
 5: Das Testament Gottes (2011, Heyne, with Rebecca Hohlbein)

 Kevin von Locksley
 1: Kevin von Locksley (1994, Bastei Lübbe)
 2: Der Ritter von Alexandria (1994, Bastei Lübbe)
 3: Die Druiden von Stonehenge (1995, Bastei Lübbe)
 4: Der Weg nach Thule (1995, Bastei Lübbe)
 Compilation 1-2: Kevins Reise (2000, Lübbe)
 Compilation 3-4: Kevins Schwur (2000, Lübbe)
 Compilation 1-4: Zwei Romane in einem Band (2007, Lübbe)
 Compilation 1-4: Kevin von Locksley (2009, Lübbe)

Horror

Stand-alone novels
 Das Teufelsloch (1990, Heyne)
 Der Inquisitor (1990, Lübbe)
 Die Moorhexe (1988, Lübbe)
 Die Prophezeiung (1993, with Heike Hohlbein, Ueberreuter)
 Die Schatten des Bösen (1992, Lübbe)
 Dunkel (May 1999, Lübbe)
 Geisterstunde (1991, Lübbe)
 Giganten (1993, with Frank Rehfeld, Lübbe)
 Halloween (2000, Lübbe)
 Videokill (1992, Goldmann)
 Kreuzfahrt – Eine Reise in den Horror (1988, Bastei-Lübbe)
 Magog (1990, Goldmann)
 Wolfsherz (September 1997, Lübbe)
 Wyrm (1998, Droemer/Knaur)
 Unheil (2007, Piper)
 Der Ruf der Tiefen (2014, Piper)
 Mörderhotel (2015, Bastei Lübbe)

Book series
 Anubis
 1: Anubis (January 2005, Lübbe)
 2: Horus (June 2007, Lübbe)

 Apokalypse-Trilogie
 1: Flut (2001, Droemer/Knaur)
 2: Feuer (December 2004, Droemer/Knaur)
 3: Sturm (2007, Droemer/Knaur)

 Azrael
 1: Azrael (1994, Heyne)
 2: Azrael – Die Wiederkehr (1998, Heyne)
 Compilation 1-2: Zwei Romane in einem Band (2002, Heyne)

 Damona King
 064: Satan's Master (1981, Bastei-Lübbe) 
 065: In the Maze of Madness (1981, Bastei-Lübbe) 
 066: The Mirror World (1981, Bastei-Lübbe) 
 067: Damona's Dark Sister (1981, Bastei-Lübbe) 
 071: The Stone Army (1981, Bastei-Lübbe) 
 072: Medusa's Brother (1981, Bastei-Lübbe) 

 Der Hexer von Salem
 Robert Craven – Die Spur des Hexers (2003)
 Robert Craven – Als der Meister Starb (2003)
 Robert Craven – Das Haus am Ende der Zeit (2003)
 Robert Craven – Tage des Wahnsinns (2003)
 Robert Craven – Der Seelenfresser (2003)
 Robert Craven – Die Chrono-Vampire (2003)
 Robert Craven – Im Bann des Puppenmachers (2003)
 Robert Craven – Engel des Bösen (2003)
 Robert Craven – Dagon - Gott aus der Tiefe (2003)
 Robert Craven – Wer den Tod Ruft (2003)
 Robert Craven – Der achtarmige Tod (2003)
 Robert Craven – Die Hand des Dämons (2003)
 Robert Craven – Ein Gigant Erwacht (2003)
 Robert Craven – Necron - Legende des Bösen (2003)
 Robert Craven – Der Koloss von New York (2003)
 Robert Craven – Stirb, Hexer! (2003)
 Robert Craven – Das Auge des Satans (2004)
 Robert Craven – Endstation Hölle (2004)
 Robert Craven – Der Abtrünnige Engel (2004)
 Robert Craven – Hochzeit mit dem Tod (2004)
 Robert Craven – Der Sohn des Hexers I (2004)
 Robert Craven – Der Sohn des Hexers II (2004)
 Robert Craven – Das Labyrinth von London (2004)
 Robert Craven – Das Haus der Bösen Träume (2004)

 Intruder
 1: Erster Tag (2002, Bastei-Lübbe)
 2: Zweiter Tag (2002, Bastei-Lübbe)
 3: Dritter Tag (2002, Bastei-Lübbe)
 4: Vierter Tag (2002, Bastei-Lübbe)
 5: Fünfter Tag (2002, Bastei-Lübbe)
 6: Sechster Tag (2003, Bastei-Lübbe)
 Compilation 1-6: Intruder - Der vollständige Roman (2004, Bastei-Lübbe)

 Nemesis
 1: Die Zeit vor Mitternacht (2004, Ullstein)
 2: Geisterstunde (2004, Ullstein)
 3: Alptraumzeit (2004, Ullstein)
 4: In dunkelster Nacht (2004, Ullstein)
 5: Die Stunde des Wolfs (2004, Ullstein)
 6: Morgengrauen (2004, Ullstein)
 Compilation 1-3: Drei Romane in einem Band (2006, Ullstein)
 Compilation 4-6: Drei Romane in einem Band (2007, Ullstein)

 Professor Zamorra
 0173: Zombie Fever (1981, Bastei-Lübbe) 
 0183: The Man Captivated by Horror (1981, Bastei-Lübbe) 

 Raven

Science fiction

Stand-alone novels 
 Bastard (based on a TV thriller by Manfred Purzer). Lübbe, 1989, .
 Das Netz Heyne, 1996, .
 Fragt Interchron! Edition Pestum, 1988, .
 Nach dem großen Feuer Kosmos, 1984, .

Book series 
 Charity
 Charity 1 - Die beste Frau der Spaceforce. Lübbe, 1989, .
 Charity 2 - Dunkel ist die Zukunft. Lübbe, 1990, .
 Charity 3 - Die Königin der Rebellen. Lübbe, 1990, .
 Charity 4 - In den Ruinen von Paris. Lübbe, 1990, .
 Charity 5 - Die schlafende Armee. Lübbe, 1990, .
 Charity 6 - Hölle aus Feuer und Eis. Lübbe, 1990, .
 Charity 7 - Die schwarze Festung. Lübbe, 1991, .
 Charity 8 - Der Spinnenkrieg. Lübbe, 1991, .
 Charity 9 - Das Sterneninferno. Lübbe, 1991, .
 Charity 10 - Die dunkle Seite des Mondes. Lübbe, 1991, .
 Charity 11 - Überfall auf Skytown. Lübbe, 1998, .
 Charity 12 - Der dritte Mond. Lübbe, 1999, .

 Dark Skies
 Dark Skies - Das Rätsel um Majestic 12. vgs, 1997, .
 Majestic - Die Saat des Todes. vgs, 1997, .

 Dino-Land
(Paperback series together with  Frank Thys and Manfred Weinland)

 Operation Nautilus
 Die vergessene Insel. Ueberreuter, 2001, .
 Das Mädchen von Atlantis. Ueberreuter, 2001, .
 Die Herren der Tiefe. Ueberreuter, 2001, .
 Im Tal der Giganten. Ueberreuter, 2001, .
 Das Meeresfeuer. Ueberreuter, 2001, .
 Die schwarze Bruderschaft. Ueberreuter, 2001, .
 Die steinerne Pest. Ueberreuter, 2002, .
 Die grauen Wächter. Ueberreuter, 2002, .
 Die Stadt der Verlorenen. Ueberreuter, 2002, .
 Die Insel der Vulkane. Ueberreuter, 2002, .
 Die Stadt unter dem Eis. Ueberreuter, 2002, .
 Die Rückkehr der Nautilus. Ueberreuter, 2002, .

 Spacelords
(Together with Johan Kerk and Ingo Martin)
 Hadrians Mond. Bastei Lübbe, 1993, .
 St. Petersburg Zwei. Bastei Lübbe, 1994, .
 Sandaras Sternenstadt. Bastei Lübbe, 1994, .
 Operation Mayflower. Bastei Lübbe, 1995, .

 Stargate SG-1
 Der Feind meines Feindes. Bd. 2, Burgschmiet, 1999, .
 Kreuzwege der Zeit. Bd. 3, Burgschmiet, 2000, .
 Jagd ins Ungewisse. Bd. 4, Burgschmiet, 2000, .
 Unsichtbare Feinde. Bd. 5, Burgschmiet, 2001, .
 Tödlicher Verrat. Bd. 6, Burgschmiet, 2001, .
 Episodenguide 1 (with Frank Rehfeld), Burgschmiet, 2000, .
 Episodenguide 2 (with Frank Rehfeld), Burgschmiet, 2001, .

 Sternenschiff der Abenteuer
(as 'Martin Hollburg')
 Der Findling im All. Bd. 1, Franckh Kosmos, 1984, .
 Schatten an Bord. Bd. 2, Franckh Kosmos, 1984, .
 Die eisige Welt. Bd. 3, Franckh Kosmos, 1984, .
 Die Tiger von Vaultron. Bd. 4, Franckh Kosmos, 1984, .
 Der Sonnenfresser. Bd. 5, Franckh Kosmos, 1984, .
 Das Kristallhirn. Bd. 6, Franckh Kosmos, 1985, .
 Die Zeitfalle des Delamere. Bd. 7, Franckh Kosmos, 1985, .

Adventure 

 Pirates of the Caribbean
(with Rebecca Hohlbein)
 1: Fluch der Karibik (2006, = Buch zum Kinofilm, vgs)
 2: Fluch der Karibik 2 (2006, = Buch zum Kinofilm, vgs)
 3: Am Ende der Welt (April 2007, = Buch zum Kinofilm, vgs)

 Indiana Jones
 1: Indiana Jones und die Gefiederte Schlange (1990, Goldmann)
 2: Indiana Jones und das Schiff der Götter (1990, Goldmann)
 3: Indiana Jones und das Gold von El Dorado (1991, Goldmann)
 4: Indiana Jones und das verschwundene Volk (1991, Goldmann)
 5: Indiana Jones und das Schwert des Dschingis Khan (1991, Goldmann)
 6: Indiana Jones und das Geheimnis der Osterinsel (1992, Goldmann)
 7: Indiana Jones und das Labyrinth des Horus (1993, Goldmann)
 8: Indiana Jones und das Erbe von Avalon (1994, Goldmann)

 Thor Garson
 1: Der Dämonengott (July 2007, Ueberreuter,  → Vorlage: Indiana Jones und die Gefiederte Schlange)
 2: Das Totenschiff (July 2007, Ueberreuter,  → Vorlage: Indiana Jones und das Schiff der Götter)
 3: Der Fluch des Goldes (July 2007, Ueberreuter,  → Vorlage: Indiana Jones und das Gold von El Dorado)
 4: Das Kristall des Todes (January 2008, Ueberreuter,  → Vorlage: Indiana Jones und das Geheimnis der Osterinseln)

Other

Miscellaneous
Das große Wolfgang Hohlbein-Buch, Bastei-Lübbe, 1994, 
Von Hexen und Drachen, Bastei-Lübbe, 2000, 
Der letzte Aufschlag, Goldmann, 1989, 
Ricky jagt die Drogenhändler as 'Henry Wolf', Ueberreuter, 1994,

Movie tie-in books 
Die Eisprinzessin, Aufbau, 1995, 
Die Hand an der Wiege, Lübbe, 1992, 
Der Fahnder, Bastei-Lübbe, 1987, 
Wiedergeburt. "The Wanderer", Heyne, 1996, 
Stirb langsam – jetzt erst recht, Lübbe, 1995, 
Das Blut der Templer, Ullstein, 2006, 
Fluch der Karibik 1–4, Egmont Vgs, 2006, 
Wir sind die Nacht, Heyne-Verlag, 2010,

See also
Wolfgang Hohlbein
Heike Hohlbein

Footnotes

External links
 
 
 Official website (German)

German science fiction writers
German fantasy writers
German male writers